Beşiktaş J.K. Athletics Team is the women's athletics section of Beşiktaş J.K., a major sports club in Istanbul, Turkey.

Current squad

Technical staff

Captains

Current squad

A team

Achievements
 Istanbul Athletics Clubs Championship
 Winners (4): 1929, 1930, 1958, 1960
 Runners (6): 1952, 1955, 1956, 1957, 1959, 1962

References

Athletics
Athletics clubs in Turkey
Running clubs in Turkey
Sport in Beşiktaş
1903 establishments in the Ottoman Empire